KOA II Part 1 (pronounced King of Amapiano 2 Part 1) is the fourth studio album by South African DJ Kabza De Small, released on June 16, 2022, through Piano Hub. The album features guest appearances from DJ Maphorisa, Ami Faku, Msaki, Young Stunna, Kwesta, Bob Mabena, Mhaw Keys and more.

Background 
In an interview with Spotify, Motha revealed that he worked on 81 songs before coming to a final 18 tracks to be included on his fourth album.

Critical reception 
At GQ Magazine, the album received scored 10/10 rating.

Commercial Performance 
On May 30, 2022, album's pre-add were made available and debuted number 11 on iTunes top 100 chart.

Accolades 
The album was nominated for Album of the Year at 2022 Afrimma and scored three nominations at the 2nd Annual South African Amapiano Music Awards Best Amapiano Album/EP, Best Amapiano Produced Song, and Song of the Year. 

!
|-
|2022
|rowspan="2"|KOA II Part 1
| Album of the Year 
|
|
|-
|rowspan="3"|2023 
|Best Amapiano Album/Ep
|
|rowspan="3"|
|-
|rowspan="2"|"Khusela" featuring Msaki 
|Best Amapiano Produced Song
| 
|-
|Song of the Year
|

Track listing

Release and singles 
The albums standard edition was released on June 16, 2022.

"Khusela" featuring Msaki was released on May 31, 2021, as album's lead single. The song debuted number 1 on Apple Music charts.

The other singles "Bathini" featuring Young Stunna and Artwork Sounds, and "Isoka" featuring Nkosazana Daughter and Murumba Pitch "Ingabe", "Eningi" featuring Njelic, Simmy and Mhaw Keys were also released on May 31, 2021.

Release history

References 

2022 albums
Amapiano albums